Traffic Department can refer to:

 Traffic Department (film), a 2013 Polish film
 Traffic Department 2192, a top down shooter game for IBM PC